Mohammad Erfan Masoumi (born 26 March 1996) is an Iranian footballer who plays as a midfielder for Shahr Khodro in the Persian Gulf Pro League.

References 

1996 births
Living people
Iranian footballers
Nassaji Mazandaran players
Association football midfielders
Pars Jonoubi Jam players